HD 76728 is a suspected astrometric binary star system in the constellation Carina. It has the Bayer designation c Carinae; HD 76728 is the identifier from the Henry Draper catalogue. The visible component has a blue-white hue and is visible to the naked eye with an apparent visual magnitude of +3.84. The system is located at a distance of approximately 320 light years from the Sun based on parallax, and it is drifting further away with a radial velocity of around +25 km/s. It is a candidate member of the Volans-Carina Association of co-moving stars.

The visible component is an aging bright giant star with a stellar classification of B8/9II. The spectrum of the star displays metallic lines of magnesium. The Volans-Carina Association to which it belongs has an age of 90 million years. The star has five times the radius of the Sun and is radiating 449 times the Sun's luminosity from its photosphere at an effective temperature of 11,880 K.

References

B-type bright giants
Astrometric binaries
Carina (constellation)
Carinae, c
Durchmusterung objects
076728
3571
043783